Burdett Woody House is a historic home located near Siler City, Chatham County, North Carolina.  It was built about 1901, and is a two-story, three bay, triple-A frame I house dwelling.  It sits on a brick pier foundation and has an original one-story rear ell.  Also on the property is a contributing smokehouse.

It was listed on the National Register of Historic Places in 2008.

References

Houses on the National Register of Historic Places in North Carolina
Houses completed in 1901
Houses in Chatham County, North Carolina
National Register of Historic Places in Chatham County, North Carolina